

101001–101100 

|-bgcolor=#f2f2f2
| colspan=4 align=center | 
|}

101101–101200 

|-bgcolor=#f2f2f2
| colspan=4 align=center | 
|}

101201–101300 

|-bgcolor=#f2f2f2
| colspan=4 align=center | 
|}

101301–101400 

|-id=331
| 101331 Sjöström ||  || Victor Sjöström (1879–1960), the father of Swedish film and one of the masters of world cinema, was a screen actor and film director. || 
|-id=383
| 101383 Karloff ||  || Boris Karloff (1887–1969), an English actor who attained cultural icon status for his portrayal of the monster in the 1931 motion picture "Frankenstein". Karloff, who also appeared in more than 150 films and television programs, has two stars on the Hollywood Walk of Fame. || 
|}

101401–101500 

|-id=432
| 101432 Adamwest ||  || Adam West (1928–2017), an American actor best known for his portrayal of the title character in the television series "Batman", which ran from 1966 to 1968. West appeared in more than 40 motion pictures and nearly 100 television programs. He also was a popular voice actor. || 
|-id=461
| 101461 Dunedin ||  || Dunedin is a city in New Zealand. Adopted home to the discoverer of this asteroid, the city, known as the "Edinburgh of the south" has been the jumping off point for many Antarctic journeys of discovery. || 
|-id=462
| 101462 Tahupotiki ||  || Tahu Potiki (1966–2019) was an important New Zealand Maori leader. He served as chief executive of Te Runanga o Ngai Tahu between 2002 and 2006. Born in Palmerston, he grew up in Karitane. In addition to his immense contributions to the community he was also a noted authority on the history of his iwi, Ngai Tahu. || 
|-id=491
| 101491 Grahamcrombie || 1998 XA || Graham William Crombie (1963–2019) was a New Zealand-born chartered accountant. As Chairman of the Otago Museum Trust Board between 2011 and 2019, he championed the construction of the world's southernmost planetarium, which opened in December 2015. || 
|}

101501–101600 

|-bgcolor=#f2f2f2
| colspan=4 align=center | 
|}

101601–101700 

|-bgcolor=#f2f2f2
| colspan=4 align=center | 
|}

101701–101800 

|-id=713
| 101713 Marston ||  || William Moulton Marston (1893–1947) was an American psychologist, author, inventor, and creator of the comic book characterWonderWoman, who first appeared in "All Star Comics" number 8 in December 1941. Marston also invented the systolic blood pressure test, a component of the modern polygraph. || 
|-id=721
| 101721 Emanuelfritsch ||  || Emanuel Fritsch (1874–1956), Czech railway engineer from Prague who was a regional representative of the Czech Tourist Club || 
|-id=722
| 101722 Pursell ||  || Wallace Pursell (born 1929), American co-founder of the Baton Rouge Astronomical Society and a lifelong amateur astronomer. || 
|-id=723
| 101723 Finger ||  || Bill Finger (1914–1974) was a comic book writer who created the major characters Batman (with Bob Kane) and Green Lantern (with Martin Nodell). He also created Robin, Catwoman, the Joker and the Penguin. He has been inducted into the Jack Kirby Hall of Fame and the Will Eisner Comic Book Hall of Fame. || 
|-id=777
| 101777 Robhoskins ||  || Robert Edward Hoskins (1965–2016) was a recognized and lauded American attorney who specialized in protecting the rights of retired workers, and successfully argued before the United States Supreme Court (Src) || 
|-id=781
| 101781 Gojira ||  || Godzilla, known in Japanese as "Gojira", debuted in the Japanese motion picture "Gojira" on 3 November 1954. It was directed by Ishiro Honda. Gojira is a kaiju (fantastic creature) that has appeared in more than 30 movies. The character, now a pop-culture icon, may be the most recognizable fantasy creature ever. || 
|}

101801–101900 

|-id=810
| 101810 Beiyou ||  || The Beijing University of Posts and Telecommunications, Beiyou, is a key multidisciplinary research university of China, with programs in engineering, management, humanities and sciences, and information technology. || 
|-id=813
| 101813 Elizabethmarston ||  || Elizabeth Holloway Marston (1893–1993) was an American attorney and psychologist. She developed, with her husband William Moulton Marston, the systolic blood-pressure test. Along with her husband's live-in mistress, Olive Byrne, she was the inspiration for the comic book creation Wonder Woman. || 
|}

101901–102000 

|-id=902
| 101902 Gisellaluccone || 1999 RN || Gisella Luccone (born 1974), friend of Italian astronomer Gianluca Masi who discovered this minor planet || 
|-id=955
| 101955 Bennu ||  || Bennu, an ancient deity from Egyptian mythology. Bennu is associated with Osiris, Atum and Ra. || 
|-id=960
| 101960 Molau ||  || Sirko Molau (born 1971), a German computer scientist and amateur astronomer who developed software for the real-time detection of meteors on a video stream (Src and Src) || 
|}

References 

101001-102000